Potiguar Esporte Clube, commonly known as Potiguar de Parnamirim, is a Brazilian football men's and women's club based in Parnamirim, Rio Grande do Norte state. They competed in the Copa do Brasil de Futebol Feminino twice.

History
The club was founded on February 15, 1946.

Women's team
The club competed in the Copa do Brasil de Futebol Feminino in 2009, when they were eliminated in the First Round by CESMAC, and in 2010, when they were eliminated in the First Round by Botafogo-PB.

Stadium
Potiguar Esporte Clube play their home games at Estádio Tenente Luís Gonzaga. The stadium has a maximum capacity of 8,000 people.

References

Football clubs in Rio Grande do Norte
Women's football clubs in Brazil
Association football clubs established in 1946
1946 establishments in Brazil